Hot Country Songs is a chart that ranks the top-performing country music songs in the United States, published by Billboard magazine.  In 2001, 22 different songs topped the chart, then published under the title Hot Country Singles & Tracks, in 52 issues of the magazine, based on weekly airplay data from country music radio stations compiled by Nielsen Broadcast Data Systems.

Singer Tim McGraw's song "My Next Thirty Years" was at number one at the start of the year, having been at the top since the issue dated December 16, 2000, and remained at number one until the issue dated January 20, when it was replaced by "Born to Fly" by Sara Evans.  McGraw also topped the chart with "Grown Men Don't Cry" in June and "Angry All the Time" in November.  Toby Keith also achieved three number ones in 2001, "You Shouldn't Kiss Me Like This" in March, "I'm Just Talkin' About Tonight" in September and "I Wanna Talk About Me" in November–December, and had the most weeks at number one of any act during the year, with nine.  Four acts each topped the charts with two songs, groups Lonestar and Brooks & Dunn and solo artists Jamie O'Neal and Alan Jackson, the latter of whom ended the year at the top of the chart with "Where Were You (When the World Stopped Turning)".  Jackson's song, written in response to the September 11 attacks and premiered at the 2001 Country Music Association Awards, reached the top spot after just six weeks on the chart, the fastest such rise for four years.  It would remain at number one until the chart dated February 2 of the following year.  The longest run at number one during 2001 was six weeks, achieved by two songs, "Ain't Nothing 'bout You" by Brooks & Dunn and "I'm Already There" by Lonestar.  "Ain't Nothing 'bout You" was ranked number one on Billboard year-end chart of the most popular country songs, and is the longest-running of the duo's twenty number ones.

Several artists achieved their first Hot Country Singles & Tracks number ones in 2001.  In the spring, two Australian singers, Jamie O'Neal and Keith Urban, achieved their first number ones in consecutive weeks with "There Is No Arizona" and "But for the Grace of God" respectively.  Teenage vocalist Jessica Andrews made her first appearance at the top of the chart in April with "Who I Am".  Later in the year Blake Shelton and Cyndi Thomson achieved their first chart-toppers with "Austin" and "What I Really Meant to Say" respectively.  O'Neal, Shelton and Thomson all reached the top position in 2001 with their first charting singles, in contrast to the previous year when no artist achieved this feat.  Shelton's five-week run at the top tied the record held by Billy Ray Cyrus for the longest spell at number one by an artist's debut single since Nielsen began compiling data for the chart in 1990.

Chart history

See also
2001 in music
List of artists who reached number one on the U.S. country chart

References

2001
2001 record charts
2001 in American music